Route 263 is a two-lane north/south highway on the south shore of the Saint Lawrence River in Quebec, Canada. Its northern terminus is in the city of Bécancour at the junction of Route 132, and the southern terminus is at the junction of Route 161 close to Saint-Augustin-de-Woburn.

List of towns along Route 263
 Sainte-Marie-de-Blandford
 Lemieux
 Saint-Louis-de-Blandford
 Princeville
 Saint-Norbert-d'Arthabaska
Sainte-Hélène-de-Chester
 Saint-Fortunat
 Saint-Jacques-le-Majeur-de-Wolfestown
 Disraeli
 Sainte-Praxède
 Saint-Romain
 Lambton
 Saint-Sébastien
 Sainte-Cécile-de-Whitton
 Marston
 Piopolis
 Saint-Augustin-de-Woburn

See also
 List of Quebec provincial highways

References

External links 
 Route 263 on Google Maps
 Provincial Route Map (Courtesy of the Quebec Ministry of Transportation) 

263